Darren James Wright (born 14 March 1968) is an English former footballer, who played as a defender. Originally a centre-back in his youth, he played professionally at full-back. He is the current head coach of the Kernow football team in Non-FIFA football.

Playing career
Wright would get his start at Wolverhampton Wanderers, the club he supported, playing for their second team whilst still in school, however he would only make one senior appearance for the club – an away match at Plymouth Argyle.

In 1986 he would sign for Wrexham, where he would make 110 appearances in 4 years, winning Young Player of the Season in both the 1987–88 and 1988–89 seasons.

His Wrexham and fully professional career would come to an end through cruciate and cartilage damage in his knee, sustained in a match with Doncaster Rovers in a 50/50 challenge with forward Mark Rankine.

After his recovery, he would move to non-league football with Worcester City, spending a year at the Worcestershire club.

He would then move to Cheltenham Town, where, during his two-year spell there he would win promotion from the Doc Martens league to the Conference, and the FA Trophy.

After Cheltenham, he would move to Stafford Rangers before ending his career at Halesowen Town.

Coaching career
After football, Wright would hold many coaching jobs, including senior team coach at Rushall Olympic, assistant manager at Continental Star and coaching youths at Wolverhampton Wanderers. He managed Panjab in 2016, taking them to the final of the 2016 ConIFA World Football Cup. In 2018 he took charge of the first Kernow football team.

Personal life
During a charity game he played for Wrexham Veterans against Mold Alexandra on 12 July 2014, Wright suffered a heart attack. He made a full recovery and was still playing charity matches in 2015.

Honours

Individual
Wrexham
Young Player of the Season: 1987–88, 1988–89

Team
Cheltenham Town
Promotion from Southern Football League: 1996–97
FA Trophy: 1997–98

References

1968 births
English footballers
English Football League players
Wolverhampton Wanderers F.C. players
Wrexham A.F.C. players
Worcester City F.C. players
Cheltenham Town F.C. players
Stafford Rangers F.C. players
Halesowen Town F.C. players
Living people
Association football defenders